Sadibou Hydara (April 1964 – 6 June 1995) was an important Gambian military and political leader who served in various international peacekeeping operations. He later served as the Gambia's Minister of Interior and government spokesman.

Early life and career
Sadibou Hydara was born in Dibba Kunda, Serekunda to Mandinka parents from the Upper Division region of the Gambia. Hydara was raised in Koidutown, Kono District, Sierra Leone, where his father was a trader. Koidutown has a large and prosperous Gambian community. Gambian educator Mohamed Hafiz Fye, a friend of Sadibou's father, was a headteacher in Koidutown. Gambian businessman Bashiru Jawara was also a long time resident of Koidutown.

Sadibou acquired his secondary school education at the prestigious all-boys Ansarul Islamic Boys Secondary School in Koidutown along with General Yankuba Drammeh, Deputy Chief of the Defence Staff of The Gambian Armed Forces, and Dr. Kaifala Marah, Sierra Leone's Minister of Finance.

After he completed his secondary school education, Hydara returned to the Gambia, where he attended Gambia College in Brikama. After joining the Gambia Army, Hydara went to study at a number of military colleges and academies around the world, including the United States, Turkey, France, Cuba, and United Kingdom  and served in various United Nations and ECOWAS peacekeeping operations. He was a member of the first Gambia contingent of the ECOWAS peacekeeping mission in Liberia (ECOMOG).

Lt. Hydara, along with Lt. Yahya Jammeh, Lt. Sana Sabally, and Lt. Edward Singhateh and other junior officers of the Gambian Army went to Banjul the capital of the Gambia to protest against President Dawda Jawara. The situation escalated into a coup, and in the confusion a military government, the Armed Forces Provisional Ruling Council (AFPRC), was formed. Yahya Jammeh emerged as the leader of the AFPRC, Sana Sabally became the deputy leader, Edward Singhateh became Defense Minister, and Sadibou Hydara, the most educated of the coup leaders, became the Minister of Interior and the spokesman of the AFPRC.

A few months after the coup, on January 27, 1995, President Yahya Jammeh accused Capt. Sadibou Hydara and Capt. Sana Sabally, the deputy leader of AFPRC of an alleged coup plot. This happened on the same day that the AFPRC junta was to announce a four-year transitional government to be headed by Jammeh. Hydara and Sabally were arrested and detained at the maximum prison. Sadibou Hydara was tortured and killed in prison on the order of Jammeh. It was believed that Sadibou Hydara, who was the most outspoken member of the AFPRC, was in favor of returning the country to democratic civilian rule, and he was strongly opposed to Yahya Jammeh's candidacy. While Jammeh wanted the military to stay in power, Hydara publicly advocated the hand over to democratically elected civilian government within one year. Even in prison, Jammeh saw Hydara as a threat to his ambition to stay in power for long. Hydara was brutally tortured and murdered in prison in June 1995.

Hydara spoke English, French, Arabic, Wolof, and his native Mandinka.

Written sources 

 Arnold Hughes, David Perfect: A Political History of The Gambia, 1816–1994 (= Rochester Studies in African History and the Diaspora. Bd. 26). University of Rochester Press, Rochester NY u. a. 2006, 
 Arnold Hughes, Harry A. Gailey: Historical dictionary of the Gambia (= African historical dictionaries. Bd. 79). 3rd edition. Scarecrow Press, Lanham MD u. a. 1999, 

Gambian military personnel
1964 births
1995 deaths
People from Serekunda
Gambian murder victims
People murdered in the Gambia
Prisoners who died in Gambian detention
Gambian people who died in prison custody